The Bordentown Military Institute was a private high school in Bordentown, New Jersey, United States, from 1881 to 1973.

History
The institute was created in 1881, when Reverend William Bowen purchased the Spring Villa Female Seminary building and reopened it as the Bordentown Military Institute. In 1972, it was merged with the Lenox School in Lenox, Massachusetts. The combined entity was shut down the following year as the Vietnam War reduced the popularity of a military education.

Notable alumni

 Tim Berra (born 1951), wide receiver who played in the NFL for the Baltimore Colts.
 Paul Boudreau (born 1949), NFL Offensive Line Coach
 George Hobart Chapman (born 1911) Colonel US Army.  Grandson of  Wyoming Senator C. D. Clark.
 Robert William Duncan, Jr. (born 1948)
 Joe Duckworth (1921-2007), football end who played in the NFL for the Washington Redskins.
 Vincent R. Kramer (1918–2001), United States Marine Corps colonel who was a guerrilla warfare expert and was awarded the Navy Cross during the Korean War.
 Nicholas S. H. Krawciw (born 1935)
 Floyd Little (born 1942), NFL Hall of Fame running back.
 Douglas Palmer (born 1951), first African-American mayor of Trenton, New Jersey.
 Barry T. Parker (born 1932), politician who served in both the New Jersey General Assembly and the New Jersey Senate.
 Joe Plumeri (born 1943), Chairman & CEO of Willis Group Holdings, and owner of the Trenton Thunder.
 Jack Robinson (1921-2000), professional baseball pitcher whose MLB career consisted of three games played for the Boston Red Sox in 1949.
 Chris Short (1937-1991), Major League Baseball pitcher 
 Willard Dickerman Straight (1880–1918)
 Mario Carlo Tucci (born 1928), owner of Delmonico's Restaurant, New York
 Stan Walters (born 1948), former NFL offensive tackle.

References

Defunct schools in New Jersey
Educational institutions established in 1881
Educational institutions disestablished in 1973
Schools in Burlington County, New Jersey
1881 establishments in New Jersey
1973 disestablishments in New Jersey